Igor Andreyevich Andreyev (born 15 August 2001) is a Russian football player who plays for FC Rodina Moscow.

Club career
On 12 January 2021, he signed a 4.5-year contract with FC Krasnodar.

He made his debut in the Russian Football National League for FC Krasnodar-2 on 6 March 2021 in a game against FC Veles Moscow.

References

External links
 
 Profile by Russian Football National League

2001 births
People from Sterlitamak
Sportspeople from Bashkortostan
Living people
Russian footballers
Association football forwards
FC Ufa players
FC Nosta Novotroitsk players
FC Krasnodar-2 players
Russian First League players
Russian Second League players